Cladonia camerunensis is a species of lichen in the family Cladoniaceae. Found in Cameroon, it was formally described as a new species in 2016 by lichenologists Teuvo Ahti and Adam Flakus. Here the lichen was found growing among plant debris over rock in open areas. The species is only known to occur in two locations on Minloua Mountain, which is a tropical inselberg. Secondary chemicals that are found in the lichen include barbatic acid (a major metabolite) and didymic acid (a minor component).

See also
List of Cladonia species

References

camerunensis
Lichen species
Lichens described in 2016
Lichens of Cameroon
Taxa named by Teuvo Ahti
Taxa named by Adam Grzegorz Flakus